William A. Ryan (May 2, 1919 - October 9, 2001) was a Democratic politician from Michigan who served as a member of the Michigan House of Representatives, and was Speaker of the House from 1969 through 1974. Ryan was also the president and financial secretary for UAW Local 104. Ryan also served as Clerk of the House in 1983 and 1984.

References

1919 births
2001 deaths
Speakers of the Michigan House of Representatives
Democratic Party members of the Michigan House of Representatives
Politicians from Morgantown, West Virginia
Politicians from Detroit
United Auto Workers people
20th-century American politicians
People from Holt, Michigan